The Tamil Evangelical Lutheran Church is a Christian denomination in south India, which was established in 1919 and has approximately 200,000 members. Its headquarters is in Trichy, Tamil Nadu. It is one of the prominent mainline Lutheran churches in Tamil Nadu.

On 14 January 1919, the Tamil congregation of different German, Danish, and Swedish Lutheran missions joined together to form the Tamil Evangelical Lutheran Church (TELC). In March 1921, the constitution of the TELC was amended to include the structure of episcopacy. In 1921, a Swedish missionary, Ernst Heuman, was ordained as the first bishop of the TELC. The bishop of TELC holds the title Bishop of Tranquebar. In 1956, R B Manickam became the first Indian to be ordained as the bishop of TELC.

The bishops have the title Bishop of Tranquebar. It belongs to the Lutheran World Federation. The Leipzig Evangelical Lutheran Mission and Church of Sweden Mission were active in the area of Trichy in the 19th century and are still active there today. This Lutheran church comes under United Evangelical Lutheran Church in India.

Presidents of TELC and Bishops of Tranquebar 

1921-1926 
1927-1934 
1934-1956 
1956-1967 Rajah Bushanam Manikam [Late]
1967-1972 
1972-1975 A. John Satyanadhan [Late]
1975-1978 Lasarus Easter Raj [Late]
1978-1993 Jayseelan Jacob [Late]
1993-1999 Jubilee Gnanabaranam Johnson [Late]
1999-2009 Thaveedu Aruldoss
2009-2014 H.A. Martin
2014-2019 S. Edwin Jayakumar
2019-2023 D. Daniel Jayaraj
2023- d Dr. Christian Samraj

Congregations

TELC Ratchagar Church, Tiruvallur (த.சு.லு.தி இரட்சகர் ஆலயம், திருவள்ளூர்])
TELC Immanuel church konerikuppam kanchipuram pastorate
TELC Holy Trinity Cathedral, Tiruchirappalli
TELC Holy Cross Church, kumbakonam.
TELC Adhisayanathar Church, Erayamangalam 
 TELC Adiaikalanathar Church, Chennai
 TELC Christ Church, Tambaram - 45
 TELC Christ Church, Thiruverambur, Tirchy- 13
 TELC Christ Church, Thiruvotriyur, Chennai-600019
 TELC Arulnathar Church, Kilpauk, Chennai
 TELC Anbunathar Church, Annanagar, Chennai
 TELC Holy Redeemer's Church, Madurai
 TELC Holy Immanuel Church, Mayiladuthurai
 TELC New Jerusalem Church, Tranquebar (Tharangambadi)
 TELC New Jerusalem Church, Nadukottai, Thirumangalam, Madurai.
 TELC Salvation Church, Madurai
 TELC Good Shepherd Church, Puthur, Trichy
 TELC Zion Church, Trichy-8.
 TELC Saviour Church, Eachampatti, Trichy
 TELC Christ Church, Anaimalai.
 TELC World Saviour Church-Uluthukkupai, Mailaduthurai
 TELC Abathu Sagayar Church, Kavalamedu. Manalmedu Pastorate.( த.சு.லு.தி. ஆபத்து சகாயர் ஆலயம் - காவாளமேடு )
 TELC Pavanasar Lutheran Church - Bangalore.
 TELC Ziegenbalg Jubilee Church - Sirkali
 TELC Pavasar Lutheran Church - Chidambaram
 TELC St.Paul's Church, Sengaraiyur
 TELC Arulnathar Church, Tirukattupalli
 TELC World Saviour Church, Pollachi 
 TELC Bethlehem Church, (TBML College) Porayar
 TELC Arulnathar Church, Tirukattupalli
 TELC Saint John Church, Tiruchirappalli
 TELC Arockianathar Church, Thirupputhur, Sivagangai Dist
 த.சு.லு.தி கதிராலயம், பாண்டுர்
 TELC Holy Cross  Church, Chengalpattu
 TELC Holy Comforter Church, Thanjavur
 TELC Ebineaser Church, Villupuram
 TELC Arulnathar Church, Kinathukadavu (த.சு.லு.தி. அருள்நாதர் ஆலயம், கிணத்துக்கடவு)
 TELC Karunainathar Church Kinathukadavu (த.சு.லு.தி. கருணைநாதர் ஆலயம், கிணத்துக்கடவு)
 TELC Bethel Church, Perambur, Chennai-11
 TELC Arulnathar Church, Tirupur-641601
 TELC Abishegha Nathar Church, Annamangalam, Perambalur-district.
 TELC Bethlehem Church Ambattur Chennai 600 053
 TELC Jesus Our Redeemer Church, Thirumangalam, Madurai.
 TELC Calvary Nathar Church, J.Alangulam, Thirumangalam, Madurai.
TELC Good Shepherd church, Singanallur, Coimbatore - 641005.
TELC St.John's Church, perambalur.# TELC St.Paul's Church, Pattavarthy. Manalmedu Pastorate.
TELC Bethlehem Church, Sevvapet, Thiruvallur-602025
TELC Christ King church, Kalpakkam - 603102
TELC Arul Nathar Church, Sadras - 603102
TELC THIRIYEGA NATHAR CHURCH, KOTTAIKARANPATTI, PUDUKKOTTAI (DT)-622515
TELC ZION JUBLEE CHURCH, PUDUKKOTTAI.
TELC RATCHANYA NATHAR CHURCH, SAMALAPURAM-641663. 
TELC JUBILEE CHURCH, PAMBARPURAM, KODAIKANAL-624103.
TELC Union Christ Christ, NGGO Colony, Coimbatore
TELC Christ Christ, Coimbatore
 TELC Arputhanather Church, B P Agraharam. 
 TELC Nalmeipper Church, Kurumanoorkadu.
 TELC Ebinezar church, Karaikal
 TELC St.Peter's Jubilee Church, Melakottucherry, Karaikal
 TELC Bethel Church, V.NALLALAM 605651

Colleges and schools
 TBML College, Porayar
 TELC Teacher Training Institute (Male), Tranquebar
 TELC Bishop Johnson Memorial Higher Secondary School, Tranquebar
 TELC High School, Sengaraiyur
 TELC Primary School, Nathamangudi, Lalgudi Taluk
 TELC Bishop Hymen Memorial High School, Tiruchirappalli
 TELC Primary School, Tiruchirappalli
 TELC Teacher Training Institute (Female), Usilampatti
 TELC ELM Hr Sec School, Chennai
 TELC Lutheran Mission Central Higher Secondary School, Sirkali
 TELC Kabis Hr Sec School, Pandur
 TELC Girls Christian Higher Secondary School, Thanjavur
 TELC Middle School, Thanjavur
 TELC SR Bergendal Girls HR Secondary School, Kinathukadavu
 TELC Primary School, Kinathukadavu
 TELC Middle School, Karunakarapuri, Kinathukadavu
 TELC Primary School, Alampatti, Thirumangalam, Madurai.
 TELC Primary School, Kurayoor.
 TECL Primary School, Tirupur
 TELC Higher secondary school, Pudukkottai. In pudukkottai itself two schools are operating
 TELC Middle School, Pudukkottai.
 TELC TSM Primary School, Sirkali
 TELC PRIMARY SCHOOL, KOTTAIKARANPATTI, PUDUKKOTTAI (DT).
 TELC Primary School, Kavalamedu ( Manalmedu ) Mayiladuthurai- DT

TELC-related seminaries
 Gurukul Lutheran Theological College and Research Institute, Chennai.
 Tamil Nadu Theological Seminary (TTS), Madurai.
 United Theological College (UTC), Bangalore.

References

External links
 Website of the United Evangelical Lutheran Church in India
 Johnson Gnanabaranam: "Tamil Evangelical Lutheran Church" in: "The Oxford Encyclopaedia of South Asian Christianity".

Christianity in Tamil Nadu
Lutheranism in India
Christian organizations established in 1919
1919 establishments in British India
Lutheran World Federation members
Evangelical denominations in Asia
Tranquebar
Affiliated institutions of the National Council of Churches in India